Achillea ageratifolia, the Balkan yarrow or Greek yarrow, is a species of flowering plant in the daisy family Asteraceae, native to Greece and Bulgaria. It is a highly variable species, with three recognized subspecies. They have erect, simple, somewhat woody based stems. The narrow grey-green foliage resembles that of a related genus Ageratum, hence the Latin specific epithet ageratifolia. The solitary, daisy-like composite flower heads are white with yellow centres and about 2–3 cm across. They appear May–July in the northern hemisphere.

Cultivation 
In cultivation in the UK, this plant has received the Royal Horticultural Society’s Award of Garden Merit. An adaptable plant, it prefers a sunny, open position. It is hardy down to -10 to -15 degrees C. It is also drought tolerant and grows well in USDA hardiness zones 3–8. Common problems include aphids and downy mildew.

Taxonomy
It was first described in 1813 as Anthemis ageratifolia by James Edward Smith in Florae Graecae, but was transferred to the genus Achillea by George Bentham & Joseph Hooker in 1873. The genus name refers to the Greek hero Achilles, who is said to have used yarrow leaves to stop his soldiers' wounds from bleeding.

References

Garden plants of Europe
ageratifolia
Flora of Southeastern Europe
Taxa named by George Bentham
Taxa named by Joseph Dalton Hooker
Plants described in 1813